Podocarpus annamiensis is a species of conifer in the family Podocarpaceae. It is found on Hainan Island of China and in Myanmar and Vietnam. It is threatened by habitat loss.

Podocarpus annamiensis has recently been considered a synonym of P. neriifolius.

References

annamiensis
Data deficient plants
Trees of China
Trees of Myanmar
Trees of Vietnam
Taxonomy articles created by Polbot